Nick Davis is an English sound engineer and record producer who is best known for his work with the band Genesis. He has also produced solo albums for several members of Genesis, as well as for other bands.

Discography

Record producer
Davis has produced or served as a sound engineer for the following albums:
Marillion: Seasons End, Marillion.com (mixer)
Genesis: We Can't Dance, Calling All Stations, Genesis Archive 1967-75, Genesis Archive 2: 1976-1992
Tony Banks: Still, Strictly Inc, Seven: A Suite For Orchestra, Six, Five
XTC: Wasp Star (Apple Venus Volume 2)
Mike + the Mechanics: Word of Mouth, Beggar on a Beach of Gold, Hits, Mike & The Mechanics (aka M6), Rewired
Sound of Contact: Dimensionaut

Surround-sound mixer
On the following albums and DVDs, Davis remixed the stereo audio, and mixed the 5.1-channel surround sound audio:

Genesis: The Way We Walk – Live in Concert DVD, Live at Wembley Stadium DVD, The Video Show DVD, Platinum Collection, Genesis 1976-1982

SACD/DVD box sets (new 5.1-channel surround sound and stereo mixes) of all Genesis studio albums were created by Davis:

Genesis: Genesis 1970–1975, Genesis 1976–1982, Genesis 1983–1998

Davis sound recorded and mixed Marillion's Live from Loreley.

References

External links
Nick Davis Record Producer
Genesis - The Last Domino? Tour
The Waiting Room Online

English record producers
Living people
Year of birth missing (living people)